Mithuna is a genus of moths in the subfamily Arctiinae first described by Frederic Moore in 1878.

Species
Mithuna arizana Wileman, 1911
Mithuna fuscivena Hampson, 1896
Mithuna quadriplaga Moore, 1878
Mithuna quadriplagoides Holloway, 2001
Mithuna strigifera Hampson, 1900

References

Lithosiini